The theory of indispensable attributes (TIA) is a theory in the context of perceptual organisation which asks for the functional units and elementary features that are relevant for a perceptual system in the constitution of perceptual objects. Earlier versions of the theory emerged in the context of an application of research on vision to audition, and analogies between vision and audition were emphasised,
whereas in more recent writings the necessity of a modality-general theory of perceptual organisation and objecthood is stressed.

The subject of perceptual organisation, and with it TIA, constitute a prime example of how theories of Gestalt psychology  have been taken up and kept alive in cognitive psychology.

TIA has been drawn on in the context of music research, in the areas of music philosophy,
and systematic music theory.

Perceptual grouping 
Since the perception of objects implies a segregation of some parts of the environment (figure) from other parts of the environment (ground), a perceptual system will have to rely on certain features in the environment for the aggregation of what goes together. This aggregation is termed perceptual grouping (PG), and the aim of TIA is the identification of conditions for the occurrence of PG.

PG is considered as a transformation happening between some input and some output. The input  is considered a set of discrete elements which are distributed over some medium . Media are also termed indispensable attributes (IA). The output PP is termed a phenomenal partition of  into subsets, or blocks, E1, E2, ..., Em.

The grouping into some block Ei occurs in reference to at least one feature Fi from a set of features .

See also 
 Auditory scene analysis
 Neural processing for individual categories of objects
 Principles of grouping
 Structural information theory

References 

Cognitive science
Grouping
Perception